Burlington Historic District is a national historic district located at Burlington, Mineral County, West Virginia.  The district includes 45 contributing buildings and 2 contributing sites in the central business district and surrounding residential areas of Burlington.  The district includes notable examples of vernacular interpretations of the Greek Revival and Queen Anne styles.

Notable buildings include The Homestead, Old Fire House, TM&P Railroad Station, Peter Arnold House, Thrush House (c. 1890), Burlington Union Church, Old Presbyterian Manse, Weaver's Antique Service Station, and Cemetery Hill.

It was listed on the National Register of Historic Places in 1992.

References

National Register of Historic Places in Mineral County, West Virginia
Historic districts in Mineral County, West Virginia
Greek Revival architecture in West Virginia
Buildings and structures in Mineral County, West Virginia
Queen Anne architecture in West Virginia
Historic districts on the National Register of Historic Places in West Virginia